The 2022 Royal London One-Day Cup tournament was a limited overs cricket competition that formed part of the 2022 domestic cricket season in England and Wales. Matches were contested over 50 overs per side, having List A cricket status, with all eighteen first-class counties competing in the tournament. The tournament began on 2 August 2022, with the final taking place on 17 September 2022 at Trent Bridge in Nottingham. Glamorgan were the defending champions, having won the 2021 tournament. Kent won the tournament, beating Lancashire by 21 runs in the final.

Teams
The teams were placed into the following groups:

 Group A: Durham, Gloucestershire, Leicestershire, Middlesex, Nottinghamshire, Somerset, Surrey, Sussex, Warwickshire
 Group B: Derbyshire, Essex, Glamorgan, Hampshire, Kent, Lancashire, Northamptonshire, Worcestershire, Yorkshire

Group A

Fixtures 
Source:

Group B

Fixtures
Source:

Standings

Group A

  Advanced directly to the semi-finals
  Advanced to the quarter-finals

Group B

  Advanced directly to the semi-finals
  Advanced to the quarter-finals

Knockout stage
The winner of each group progressed straight to the semi-finals with the second and third placed teams playing a play-off match against a team from the other group which made up the play-offs. The winner of each play-off played one of the group winners in the semi-finals.

Quarter-finals

Semi-finals

Final

References

External links
 Series home at ESPN Cricinfo

Royal London One-Day Cup
Royal London One-Day Cup